U.S. Vision, a wholly owned subsidiary of Refac Optical Group, is an international optometric dispensary chain. The vast majority of these locations are leased spaces in large department stores, such as J.C. Penney, Boscov's and Meijer as well as AAFES, Military Exchanges. As of February 28, 2021 the Company had 373 locations in 44 states, consisting of licensed departments and freestanding stores. U.S. Vision deals mainly in prescription eyewear, contact lenses, and optometry offices.

History 
In 1885, William Well and Charles Ochs opened a retail optical store in Philadelphia, Pennsylvania, that is still in operation today. With this as a beginning, other optical locations were purchased, starting the first optical store chain in the United States. In the early 1970s, the company purchased Wall and Ochs, combined it with a manufacturing facility in Blackwood, New Jersey, and named the new combination of manufacturing and sales U.S. Vision.

Location names 
U.S. Vision, being a parent company, is known under many different names throughout the U.S. and Canada. Primarily operating out of leased areas in large department stores such as J.C. Penney and Boscov's, and named by simply adding Optical to the host store's name (exp: J.C. Penney Optical, Boscov's Optical).

References

External links
 Company Website
 JCPenney Optical

Eyewear companies of the United States
American companies established in 1885
Retail companies established in 1885
Eyewear retailers of the United States
Companies based in Camden County, New Jersey
1885 establishments in Pennsylvania